Taşkesiği, Manavgat is a village in the District of Manavgat, Antalya Province, Turkey.

References

Villages in Manavgat District